The 1961 Irish general election to the 17th Dáil was held on Wednesday, 4 October, following the dissolution of the 16th Dáil on 15 September by President Éamon de Valera on the request of Taoiseach Seán Lemass. The general election took place in 38 Dáil constituencies throughout Ireland for 144 seats in Dáil Éireann, the house of representatives of the Oireachtas, which had been reduced in size by three seats from the previous election by the Electoral (Amendment) Act 1961. Fianna Fáil lost its majority but remained the dominant party

The 17th Dáil met at Leinster House on 11 October to nominate the Taoiseach for appointment by the president and to approve the appointment of a new government of Ireland. Lemass was re-appointed Taoiseach, forming the 10th Government of Ireland, a single-party minority Fianna Fáil government.

Campaign
At the general election of 1961, the three main parties were led by new leaders: Seán Lemass had taken charge of Fianna Fáil in 1959, making this the first time Fianna Fáil faced a general election campaign without Éamon de Valera (who had become President of Ireland in 1959). James Dillon had taken over at Fine Gael in 1959 also, while the Labour Party was now under the leadership of Brendan Corish.

Lemass announced the date of the election on 8 September, with the dissolution to take place a week later on 15 September. It was the shortest period between the dissolution and the election permitted in law.

While the election was caused by the "crisis" surrounding Ireland's application for membership of the European Economic Community and various other international affairs, little attention was paid to these matters during the campaign; the 1961 general election has become known as the dullest campaign on record, with the most important issue being the teaching of the Irish language in schools. Fianna Fáil fought the election on its record in government and a reforming theme; Fine Gael presented itself as the party of free enterprise. The Labour Party campaigned strongly against the "conservative" Fianna Fáil and Fine Gael parties. It also favoured major expansion in the public sector. It was the first and only general election contested by the National Progressive Democrats led by Noël Browne.

Result

|}

Voting summary

Seats summary

Government formation
The 17th Dáil met on 11 October 1961. Fianna Fáil were short of a majority, with 70 of the 144 seats in the Dáil, but were able to form a new single-party government, the 10th Government of Ireland, with the support of Independent TDs.

Changes in membership

First-time TDs
Lorcan Allen
Mark Clinton
George Colley
Patrick Connor
Paddy Harte
Brian Lenihan
Tom O'Donnell
Séamus Pattison
Eugene Timmons
Seán Treacy

Re-elected TDs
Seán Collins

Outgoing TDs
Batt Donegan (lost seat)
Patrick Giles (retired)
Gus Healy (lost seat)
Denis Larkin (lost seat)
Frank Loughman (lost seat)
Peadar Maher (retired)
Richard Mulcahy (retired)
James O'Toole (lost seat)
Oscar Traynor (retired)

Notes

References

1961 elections in Europe
General election, 1961
1961 in Irish politics
1961
17th Dáil
October 1961 events in Europe